Saint-Jean-en-Royans (Vivaro-Alpine: Sant Joan de Roians) is a commune in the Drôme department in southeastern France.

Population

International relations
Saint-Jean-en-Royans is twinned with:
Câmpani, Romania
Roccagorga, Italy

See also
Communes of the Drôme department
Parc naturel régional du Vercors
Velo Vercors

References

Communes of Drôme